Four vessels named Devonshire for the British county of Devon, served the British East India Company (EIC) as East Indiamen:

, of 500 tons (bm), made four voyages for the EIC before she was sold in 1834 and renamed Triumph. Triumph wrecked on the Goodwin Sands in 1737 with the loss of all her complement while sailing to Cadiz for her Spanish owners.
, of 560 tons (bm), was wrecked in 1737 at the mouth of the River Ganges during her first voyage.
, of 637 tons (bm), made four voyages for the EIC before she was sold in 1773 for breaking up.
 made four voyages for the British East India Company (EIC), and was wrecked on her fifth while still outward bound.

Further reading

Ship names
Age of Sail merchant ships of England